Elberta is a town in Baldwin County, Alabama, United States. At the 2010 census the population was 1,498, up from 552 at the 2000 census. It is part of the Daphne-Fairhope-Foley metropolitan area.

Geography
Elberta is located in southern Baldwin County. U.S. Route 98 (State Avenue) passes through the center of the town, leading west  to Foley and east  to Lillian, at the Florida border.

Demographics

2020 census

As of the 2020 United States census, there were 1,974 people, 752 households, and 413 families residing in the town.

2010 census
As of the census of 2010, there were 1,498 people, 653 households, and 416 families residing in the town. The racial makeup of the town was 92.9% White, 1.4% Black or African American, 0.3% Native American, 0.1% Pacific Islander, 0.8% Asian, 2.5% from other races, and 2.0% from two or more races. 5.3% of the population were Hispanic or Latino of any race.

There were 653 households, out of which 23.4% had children under the age of 18 living with them, 46.7% were married couples living together, 13.2% had a female householder with no husband present, and 36.3% were non-families. 29.2% of all households were made up of individuals, and 13.3% had someone living alone who was 65 years of age or older. The average household size was 2.29 and the average family size was 2.80.

In the town, the population was spread out, with 21.2% under the age of 18, 6.3% from 18 to 24, 23.8% from 25 to 44, 28.5% from 45 to 64, and 20.2% who were 65 years of age or older. The median age was 43.7 years. For every 100 females, there were 101.6 males. For every 100 females age 18 and over, there were 92.5 males.

The median income for a household in the town was $30,161, and the median income for a family was $31,964. Males had a median income of $29,575 versus $27,971 for females. The per capita income for the town was $17,027. About 12.3% of families and 18.5% of the population were below the poverty line, including 40.9% of those under age 18 and 5.7% of those age 65 or over.

Education 
Elberta is a part of the Baldwin County Public Schools system.

Elberta has two public schools, which are Elberta Elementary School (K-6) and Elberta High School (7-12). In addition, there is one private school in Elberta; Saint Benedict's Catholic School. The school was founded in 1921 and serves the six surrounding parishes of: St. Bartholomew, Elberta,  St. Margaret of Scotland, Foley,  St. Joseph, Lillian, Our Lady of the Gulf, Gulf Shores, and St. Thomas by the Sea, Orange Beach. Elberta High School opened to grade nine as of August 2017 and had its first graduating class in 2021.

History 

Elberta was founded in the early 20th century by a Chicago-based land company. The Baldwin County Colonization Company was organized in 1903, and the first settlers arrived in 1904. The community was founded by farmers who had immigrated from Germany to the Midwest of America. The land company advertised the area as having rich soil and a climate that allowed year-round farming. The first two organized churches were Lutheran (1908) and Catholic (1905).

The land company laid out Baldwin County in the manner found in the Midwest; that is to say, roads were laid out on section lines that were due north-south and east-west. Property, especially farms, were laid out in squares. With the immigration taking these farmers through Ohio, Indiana, Illinois, and other Midwestern states, the early years of the community resembled Midwestern farming communities more than those of the Deep South. In the 1930s through the 1940s, the town boasted a farmer's hall where dancing and singing were enjoyed, a hotel, and a movie theatre, as well as a butcher shop, grocery and drug store. Many of the residents spoke German, and St. Mark's Lutheran Church offered German-language services until 1976.

The State Bank of Elberta was incorporated in 1922. The bank was unusual in that it did not close during the Great Depression.

The town was incorporated by vote on December 9, 1952.

To support the town's volunteer fire department, the Elberta German Sausage Festival was started in the mid-1970s. This event is held the last weekend of March and the last weekend of October and features polka music, Elberta German Sausage, and 250 arts and crafts vendors. In 2014, the October festival saw an estimated 40,000 visitors.

The town is the home of the Baldwin County Heritage Museum. The museum is located on U.S. Highway 98 east of the town. It features exhibits devoted to the development of Baldwin County. The museum includes a large amount of farm equipment and exhibits of life in farm homes. The old St. Mark's Lutheran Church building was moved to the grounds and restored.

References

External links

 Elberta Fire Department
 Baldwin County Heritage Museum

German-American culture in Alabama
Towns in Alabama
Towns in Baldwin County, Alabama
Populated places established in 1904